The women's club throw at the 2012 IPC Athletics European Championships was held at Stadskanaal Stadium from 24 to 28 July.

Medalists
Results given by IPC Athletics.

See also
List of IPC world records in athletics

References

Club throw
2012 in women's athletics
Club throw at the World Para Athletics European Championships